DeShon Elliott (born April 21, 1997) is an American football free safety for the Miami Dolphins of the National Football League (NFL). He played college football at Texas and was drafted by the Baltimore Ravens in the sixth round of the 2018 NFL Draft.

Early years
Elliott attended Rockwall-Heath High School in Heath, Texas, where he played high school football. He  committed to the University of Texas to play college football.

College career
As a freshman at Texas in 2015, Elliott played in seven games and recorded 13 tackles and two interceptions. As a sophomore he played in 12 games and made one start, recording 30 tackles, one interception and one sack. As a junior in 2017, Elliott was a finalist for the Jim Thorpe Award. In late November 2017, it was announced that Elliott would forgo his senior year at Texas in favor of the 2018 NFL Draft, and that he would not play in the Longhorns' bowl game.

Professional career

Baltimore Ravens 

Elliott was drafted by the Baltimore Ravens in the sixth round, 190th overall, of the 2018 NFL Draft. He was placed on injured reserve on August 31, 2018 with a fractured forearm.

On October 15, 2019, Elliott was placed on injured reserve with a knee injury.

Originated slated to be the backup safety for the 2020 season, Elliott was thrust into the starting role following the release of Earl Thomas on August 23. In Week 2, Elliott recorded his first career sack against Houston Texans quarterback Deshaun Watson as the Ravens defeated the Texans 33–16. He was placed on the reserve/COVID-19 list by the team on November 3, 2020, and activated four days later.

Elliott, would remain the starter for a injury-depleted Ravens secondary for the 2021 season. On November 8, 2021, Elliott was placed on injured reserve after suffering a season-ending biceps and pectoral injury late in the fourth quarter of a Week 8 34–31 overtime win over the Minnesota Vikings.

Detroit Lions 
On April 14, 2022, the Detroit Lions signed Elliott to a one-year contract. He entered the season as the Lions starting free safety. He played in 14 games with 13 starts, recording 96 tackles, three passes defensed, one interception and a forced fumble.

Miami Dolphins
On March 17, 2023, Elliott signed a one-year contract with the Miami Dolphins.

References

External links

Texas Longhorns bio

1997 births
Living people
Players of American football from Dallas
People from Heath, Texas
American football safeties
Texas Longhorns football players
All-American college football players
Baltimore Ravens players
Detroit Lions players
Miami Dolphins players